Gertrudis Gómez (born 4 February 1970) is a Cuban former basketball player who competed in the 1996 Summer Olympics.

References

1970 births
Living people
Cuban women's basketball players
Olympic basketball players of Cuba
Basketball players at the 1996 Summer Olympics